The 2017–18 season was Atlético Madrid's 87th season since foundation in 1903 and the club's 81st season in La Liga, the top league of Spanish football. Atlético competed in La Liga, Copa del Rey, UEFA Champions League and UEFA Europa League. It was also the first season that Atlético played at the Wanda Metropolitano.

Kits
Supplier: Nike / First Sponsor: Plus500

Players

Transfers

In

1would be registered and able to play after January 1, 2018.

Out

150% of rights sold, player signed contract for 5 years.

Pre-season and friendlies

Summer

Winter

GOtv Max Cup

Competitions

Overview

La Liga

League table

Results summary

Results by round

Matches

Copa del Rey

Round of 32

Round of 16

Quarter-finals

UEFA Champions League

Group stage

UEFA Europa League

Knockout phase

Round of 32

Round of 16

Quarter-finals

Semi-finals

Final

Statistics

Squad statistics

1Players from reserve team - Atlético Madrid B.

Goalscorers

Clean sheets

Attendances

Awards

La Liga Player of the Month
Antoine Griezmann named Liga Santander Player of the Month for February.

References

External links

Atlético Madrid seasons
Atlético Madrid
Atlético Madrid
UEFA Europa League-winning seasons